Vertisphaera is a genus of small carnivorous bivalves in the family Verticordiidae. It contains the single species V. cambrica.

References 

Verticordiidae
Monotypic mollusc genera
Molluscs described in 1930
Bivalve genera